Russell Simon Garcia (born 20 June 1970) is an English field hockey coach and a former England & GB field hockey player. He won a gold medal with Great Britain at the 1988 Summer Olympics in Seoul at the age of 18 years 3 months, making him Britain's youngest ever Olympic champion.

International career
Garcia was born in Portsmouth. He played international hockey from 1988 to 2000 and was awarded his first cap aged 17. He was invited back into the British team in January 2004 to try and strengthen the squad preparing for the 2004 Summer Olympics, being cut in the final selection period. He played over 300 games and scored more than 70 goals for England and Great Britain. In 1998 he was nominated by the International Hockey Federation for World Best Player of the Year.

Garcia also competed in the 1992 and 1996 Summer Olympics. He played club hockey in England, Spain, Germany and the Netherlands. Between 1998 and 2000 he played in Germany, where he won two league titles and one cup winners medal with Harvestehuder THC. He represented England and won a bronze medal in the men's hockey, at the 1998 Commonwealth Games in Kuala Lumpur.

Coaching career
Garcia is a very experienced hockey coach.
Between 1993 and 1996 he was player coach at Real Club de Polo Barcelona. Between the ages of 23-26 he took his Spanish club team to two European Cup Winners tournaments, 1995 winning a bronze medal in Italy, and three cup finals (Copa del Rey). Between 1996 and 1998 Garcia played for HDM, a Dutch field hockey club based in The Hague. During his time in the Netherlands he coached the youth under 18 boys team of Leiden to the national field playoffs and becoming national indoor champions. Garcia was appointed Head Coach of HC Bloemendaal in Netherlands between June 2012 – 2016. Bloemendaal won the European Hockey League in 2013 and came second in the Hoofdklasse in 2014. In July 2016 he was appointed Head Coach of Der Club an der Alster, Hamburg, Germany.

At International level Garcia was Head Coached of the Scotland men's national field hockey team between 2008 and 2011.
He also worked as Assistant Coach for Holland, Germany, England and Great Britain. In 2018 Garcia helped England to 4th place at the World Cup in Bhubaneswar.

References

External links
 
 
 

1970 births
Living people
Sportspeople from Portsmouth
English male field hockey players
English field hockey coaches
English Olympic medallists
Olympic field hockey players of Great Britain
British male field hockey players
Olympic gold medallists for Great Britain
Field hockey players at the 1988 Summer Olympics
Field hockey players at the 1992 Summer Olympics
Field hockey players at the 1996 Summer Olympics
1998 Men's Hockey World Cup players
English sportspeople in doping cases
Commonwealth Games bronze medallists for England
Place of birth missing (living people)
Olympic medalists in field hockey
Medalists at the 1988 Summer Olympics
Commonwealth Games medallists in field hockey
Real Club de Polo de Barcelona players
Harvestehuder THC players
Haagsche Delftsche Mixed players
Expatriate field hockey players
Havant Hockey Club players
Field hockey players at the 1998 Commonwealth Games
1990 Men's Hockey World Cup players
Medallists at the 1998 Commonwealth Games